Philip Vesty (born 5 January 1963) is a British racewalker. He competed in the men's 20 kilometres walk at the 1984 Summer Olympics.

References

1963 births
Living people
Athletes (track and field) at the 1984 Summer Olympics
British male racewalkers
Olympic athletes of Great Britain
Place of birth missing (living people)